Deis may refer to:

People
 Eric Deis (born 1979), Canadian photographer
 Matt Deis (born 1983), American bass guitarist
 Tyler Deis (born 1974), Canadian ice hockey player

Other
 Deis, a character in Breath of Fire
 Draft environmental impact statement